The 2016–17 Volleyball Thailand League was the 12th season of the Thai League, the top Thai professional league for association volleyball clubs, since its establishment in 2005. A total of 8 teams competed in the league. The season started on 19 November 2016.

Wing 46 Phitsanulok are the defending champions, having won the Volleyball Thailand League title the previous season.

Team
 Nakhon Ratchasima The Mall
 NK Fitness Samutsakhon
 Diamond Food RMUTL Phitsanulok
 Sisaket
 RSU VC
 Air Force
 Kasetsart
 Koh Kood Cabana Ratchaburi

Foreign players

Ranking 

|}

Result table

Results

Round 1 

|}

|}

|}

|}

|}

|}

|}

Round 2 

|}

|}

|}

|}

|}

|}

|}

|}

Final standing

Awards

Most Valuable Player
 
Best Scorer
 
Best Opposite
 
Best Outside Spikers
 

Best Middle Blockers
 
Best Setter

Best Libero

See also 
 2016–17 Women's Volleyball Thailand League

References

Thailand League
Thailand League
2016